István Havasi (December 21, 1930 in Dánszentmiklós, Pest – February 16, 2003 in Budapest) was a male race walker from Hungary. He competed for his native country at the 1964 Summer Olympics.

Achievements

References
 

1930 births
2003 deaths
Hungarian male racewalkers
Athletes (track and field) at the 1964 Summer Olympics
Olympic athletes of Hungary
World Athletics Race Walking Team Championships winners
Sportspeople from Pest County